An out-of-box experience (OOBE) is the experience an end-user has when taking a product after unboxing, or for digital distribution, runs the installer, and is preparing to first use it, as opposed to the point-of-sale experience or the interaction experience of an expert user. In computing, this includes the initial configuration of a piece of hardware or software on a computer. The out-of-box experience is typically the first impression a product creates, such as the ease with which a buyer can begin using the product. For hardware products, a positive OOBE can be created with logical easy-to-follow instructions and good quality of manufacturing.
Microsoft uses this term, particuarly, to refer to the user experience that takes place after software installation, and immediately following the first launch of a software product.

Out-of-box failure 
An out-of-box failure (OBF or OOBF) refers to the perceived failure of a product that occurs immediately upon first usage. In relations to computing, an out-of-box failure can refer to the immediate failure mode when installing or performing initial configuration on a piece of computer hardware or software, or a physical defect involving the installation media which requires a return and acquisition of a non-defective product. Causes for out-of-box failures include poor quality control, wrong configuration of the product, and bugs/glitches if the failure is software-related. It can be highly detrimental to the value of the brand, retailer, or OEM, especially when customer expectations for the product are high.

See also 

 Unboxing
 First-time user experience
 Out of the box (feature)
 Dead on arrival

References

Windows administration
Human–computer interaction
Customer experience